The Society of Jesus (abbreviation: SJ), commonly known as the Jesuits, is a religious order of clerics regular of pontifical right for men in the Catholic Church headquartered in Rome. It was founded in 1540 by Ignatius of Loyola and six companions, with the approval of Pope Paul III. The society is engaged in evangelization and apostolic ministry in 112 nations. Jesuits work in education, research, and cultural pursuits. Jesuits also conduct retreats, minister in hospitals and parishes, sponsor direct social and humanitarian ministries, and promote ecumenical dialogue.

The Society of Jesus is consecrated under the patronage of Madonna della Strada, a title of the Blessed Virgin Mary, and it is led by a Superior General. The headquarters of the society, its General Curia, is in Rome. The historic curia of Ignatius is now part of the  attached to the Church of the Gesù, the Jesuit mother church.

Members of the Society of Jesus are expected to accept orders to go anywhere in the world, where they might be required to live in extreme conditions. This was so because Ignatius, its leading founder, was a nobleman who had a military background. Accordingly, the opening lines of the founding document declared that the society was founded for "whoever desires to serve as a soldier of God, to strive especially for the defense and propagation of the faith, and for the progress of souls in Christian life and doctrine". Jesuits are thus sometimes referred to colloquially as "God's soldiers", "God's marines", or "the Company". The society participated in the Counter-Reformation and, later, in the implementation of the Second Vatican Council.

History

Foundation

Ignatius of Loyola, a Basque nobleman from the Pyrenees area of northern Spain, founded the society after discerning his spiritual vocation while recovering from a wound sustained in the Battle of Pamplona. He composed the Spiritual Exercises to help others follow the teachings of Jesus Christ. In 1534, Ignatius and six other young men, including Francis Xavier and Peter Faber, gathered and professed promises of poverty, chastity, and later obedience, including a special vow of obedience to the pope in matters of mission direction and assignment. Ignatius's plan of the order's organization was approved by Pope Paul III in 1540 by a bull containing the "Formula of the Institute".

On 15 August 1534, Ignatius of Loyola (born Íñigo López de Loyola), a Spaniard from the Basque city of Loyola, and six others mostly of Castilian origin, all students at the University of Paris, met in Montmartre outside Paris, in a crypt beneath the church of Saint Denis, now Saint Pierre de Montmartre, to pronounce promises of poverty, chastity, and obedience. Ignatius' six companions were: Francisco Xavier from Navarre (modern Spain), Alfonso Salmeron, Diego Laínez, Nicolás Bobadilla from Castile (modern Spain), Peter Faber from Savoy, and Simão Rodrigues from Portugal. The meeting has been commemorated in the Martyrium of Saint Denis, Montmartre. The name "company" had echoes of the military (reflecting perhaps Ignatius' background as Captain in the Spanish army) as well as of discipleship (the "companions" of Jesus). From this came "Society of Jesus" (SJ) by which they would be known more widely.

Religious orders established in the medieval era were named after particular men: Francis of Assisi (Franciscans); Domingo de Guzmán, later canonized as Saint Dominic (Dominicans); and Augustine of Hippo (Augustinians). Ignatius of Loyola and his followers appropriated the name of Jesus for their new order, provoking resentment by other orders who considered it presumptuous. The resentment was recorded by Jesuit José de Acosta of a conversation with the Archbishop of Santo Domingo. In the words of one historian: "The use of the name Jesus gave great offense. Both on the Continent and in England, it was denounced as blasphemous; petitions were sent to kings and to civil and ecclesiastical tribunals to have it changed; and even Pope Sixtus V had signed a Brief to do away with it." But nothing came of all the opposition; there were already congregations named after the Trinity and as "God's daughters".

In 1537, the seven travelled to Italy to seek papal approval for their order. Pope Paul III gave them a commendation, and permitted them to be ordained priests. These initial steps led to the official founding in 1540.

They were ordained in Venice by the bishop of Arbe (24 June). They devoted themselves to preaching and charitable work in Italy. The Italian War of 1535-1538 renewed between Charles V, Holy Roman Emperor, Venice, the Pope, and the Ottoman Empire, had rendered any journey to Jerusalem impossible.

Again in 1540, they presented the project to Paul III. After months of dispute, a congregation of cardinals reported favourably upon the Constitution presented, and Paul III confirmed the order through the bull  ("To the Government of the Church Militant"), on 27 September 1540. This is the founding document of the Society of Jesus as an official Catholic religious order. Ignatius was chosen as the first Superior General. Paul III's bull had limited the number of its members to sixty. This limitation was removed through the bull  of Julius III in 1550.

In 1543, Pierre Canisius entered the Company. Ignatius sent him to Messina, where he founded the first Jesuit college in Sicily.

Ignatius laid out his original vision for the new order in the "Formula of the Institute of the Society of Jesus", which is "the fundamental charter of the order, of which all subsequent official documents were elaborations and to which they had to conform". He ensured that his formula was contained in two papal bulls signed by Pope Paul III in 1540 and by Pope Julius III in 1550. The formula expressed the nature, spirituality, community life, and apostolate of the new religious order. Its famous opening statement echoed Ignatius' military background:

In fulfilling the mission of the "Formula of the Institute of the Society", the first Jesuits concentrated on a few key activities. First, they founded schools throughout Europe. Jesuit teachers were trained in both classical studies and theology, and their schools reflected this. Second, they sent out missionaries across the globe to evangelize those peoples who had not yet heard the Gospel, founding missions in widely diverse regions such as modern-day Paraguay, Japan, Ontario, and Ethiopia. One of the original seven arrived in India already in 1541. Finally, though not initially formed for the purpose, they aimed to stop Protestantism from spreading and to preserve communion with Rome and the pope. The zeal of the Jesuits overcame the movement toward Protestantism in the Polish–Lithuanian Commonwealth and southern Germany.

Ignatius wrote the Jesuit Constitutions, adopted in 1553, which created a centralised organization and stressed acceptance of any mission to which the pope might call them. His main principle became the unofficial Jesuit motto:  ("For the greater glory of God"). This phrase is designed to reflect the idea that any work that is not evil can be meritorious for the spiritual life if it is performed with this intention, even things normally considered of little importance.

The Society of Jesus is classified among institutes as a mendicant order of clerks regular, that is, a body of priests organized for apostolic work, following a religious rule, and relying on alms, or donations, for support.

The term Jesuit (of 15th-century origin, meaning "one who used too frequently or appropriated the name of Jesus") was first applied to the society in reproach (1544–1552). The term was never used by Ignatius of Loyola, but over time, members and friends of the society adopted the name with a positive meaning.

Early works

The Jesuits were founded just before the Council of Trent (1545–1563) and ensuing Counter-Reformation that would introduce reforms within the Catholic Church, and so counter the Protestant Reformation throughout Catholic Europe.

Ignatius and the early Jesuits did recognize, though, that the hierarchical church was in dire need of reform. Some of their greatest struggles were against corruption, venality, and spiritual lassitude within the Catholic Church. Ignatius insisted on a high level of academic preparation for the clergy in contrast to the relatively poor education of much of the clergy of his time. The Jesuit vow against "ambitioning prelacies" can be seen as an effort to counteract another problem evidenced in the preceding century.

Ignatius and the Jesuits who followed him believed that the reform of the church had to begin with the conversion of an individual's heart. One of the main tools the Jesuits have used to bring about this conversion is the Ignatian retreat, called the Spiritual Exercises. During a four-week period of silence, individuals undergo a series of directed meditations on the purpose of life and contemplations on the life of Christ. They meet regularly with a spiritual director who guides their choice of exercises and helps them to develop a more discerning love for Christ.

The retreat follows a "Purgative-Illuminative-Unitive" pattern in the tradition of the spirituality of John Cassian and the Desert Fathers. Ignatius' innovation was to make this style of contemplative mysticism available to all people in active life. Further, he used it as a means of rebuilding the spiritual life of the church. The Exercises became both the basis for the training of Jesuits and one of the essential ministries of the order: giving the exercises to others in what became known as "retreats".

The Jesuits' contributions to the late Renaissance were significant in their roles both as a missionary order and as the first religious order to operate colleges and universities as a principal and distinct ministry. By the time of Ignatius' death in 1556, the Jesuits were already operating a network of 74 colleges on three continents. A precursor to liberal education, the Jesuit plan of studies incorporated the Classical teachings of Renaissance humanism into the Scholastic structure of Catholic thought.

In addition to the teachings of faith, the Jesuit  (1599) would standardize the study of Latin, Greek, classical literature, poetry, and philosophy as well as non-European languages, sciences, and the arts. Furthermore, Jesuit schools encouraged the study of vernacular literature and rhetoric, and thereby became important centres for the training of lawyers and public officials.

The Jesuit schools played an important part in winning back to Catholicism a number of European countries which had for a time been predominantly Protestant, notably Poland and Lithuania. Today, Jesuit colleges and universities are located in over one hundred nations around the world. Under the notion that God can be encountered through created things and especially art, they encouraged the use of ceremony and decoration in Catholic ritual and devotion. Perhaps as a result of this appreciation for art, coupled with their spiritual practice of "finding God in all things", many early Jesuits distinguished themselves in the visual and performing arts as well as in music. The theater was a form of expression especially prominent in Jesuit schools.

Jesuit priests often acted as confessors to kings during the early modern period. They were an important force in the Counter-Reformation and in the Catholic missions, in part because their relatively loose structure (without the requirements of living and celebration of the Liturgy of Hours in common) allowed them to be flexible and meet diverse needs arising at the time.

Expansion of the order

After much training and experience in theology, Jesuits went across the globe in search of converts to Christianity. Despite their dedication, they had little success in Asia, except in the Philippines. For instance, early missions in Japan resulted in the government granting the Jesuits the feudal fiefdom of Nagasaki in 1580. This was removed in 1587 due to fears over their growing influence. Jesuits did, however, have much success in Latin America. Their ascendancy in societies in the Americas accelerated during the seventeenth century, wherein Jesuits created new missions in Peru, Colombia, and Bolivia; as early as 1603, there were 345 Jesuit priests in Mexico alone.

Francis Xavier, one of the original companions of Loyola, arrived in Goa (Portuguese India) in 1541 to carry out evangelical service in the Indies. In a 1545 letter to John III of Portugal, he requested an Inquisition to be installed in Goa to combat heresies like crypto-Judaism and crypto-Islam. Under Portuguese royal patronage, Jesuits thrived in Goa and until 1759 successfully expanded their activities to education and healthcare. In 1594 they founded the first Roman-style academic institution in the East, St. Paul Jesuit College in Macau, China. Founded by Alessandro Valignano, it had a great influence on the learning of Eastern languages (Chinese and Japanese) and culture by missionary Jesuits, becoming home to the first western sinologists such as Matteo Ricci. Jesuit efforts in Goa were interrupted by the expulsion of the Jesuits from Portuguese territories in 1759 by the powerful Marquis of Pombal, Secretary of State in Portugal.

The Portuguese Jesuit António de Andrade founded a mission in Western Tibet in 1624. Two Jesuit missionaries, Johann Grueber and Albert Dorville, reached Lhasa, in Tibet, in 1661. The Italian Jesuit Ippolito Desideri established a new Jesuit mission in Lhasa and Central Tibet (1716–21) and gained an exceptional mastery of Tibetan language and culture, writing a long and very detailed account of the country and its religion as well as treatises in Tibetan that attempted to refute key Buddhist ideas and establish the truth of Catholic Christianity.
Jesuit missions in America became controversial in Europe, especially in Spain and Portugal where they were seen as interfering with the proper colonial enterprises of the royal governments. The Jesuits were often the only force standing between the Native Americans and slavery. Together throughout South America but especially in present-day Brazil and Paraguay, they formed Christian Native American city-states, called "reductions". These were societies set up according to an idealized theocratic model. The efforts of Jesuits like Antonio Ruiz de Montoya to protect the natives from enslavement by Spanish and Portuguese colonizers would contribute to the call for the society's suppression. Jesuit priests such as Manuel da Nóbrega and José de Anchieta founded several towns in Brazil in the 16th century, including São Paulo and Rio de Janeiro, and were very influential in the pacification, religious conversion, and education of indigenous nations. They also built schools, organized people into villages, and created a writing system for the local languages of Brazil. José de Anchieta and Manuel da Nóbrega were the first Jesuits that Ignacio de Loyola sent to America.

Jesuit scholars working in foreign missions were very dedicated in studying the local languages and strove to produce Latinized grammars and dictionaries.

Jesuit missionaries were active among indigenous peoples in New France in North America, many of them compiling dictionaries or glossaries of the First Nations and Native American languages they had learned. For instance, before his death in 1708, Jacques Gravier, vicar general of the Illinois Mission in the Mississippi River valley, compiled a Kaskaskia Illinois–French dictionary, considered the most extensive among works of the missionaries. Extensive documentation was left in the form of The Jesuit Relations, published annually from 1632 until 1673.

Britain
Whereas Jesuits were active in the 16th century, due to the prosecution of Catholics in the Elizabethan times, an 'English' province was only established in 1623. Whereas the first pressing issue of early Jesuits, in what today is the UK, was to establish places for training priests, the Society's activities today are much broader than that. After an English College was opened in Rome (1579), a Jesuit seminary was opened at Valladolid (1589), then one in Seville (1592), which culminated in a place of study in Louvain (1614). This was the earliest foundation of what would later be called Heythrop College. Campion Hall founded in 1896, has been a presence within Oxford University since then. In terms of other longer-established manifestations of the Jesuits commitment to working in Britain, four Jesuit churches remain today in London alone, with four further places of workship in England, and two in Scotland.
For a recent assessment of the Jesuits in Britain's work, see Melanie McDonagh's article.

China

The Jesuits first entered China through the Portuguese settlement on Macau, where they settled on Green Island and founded St. Paul's College.

The Jesuit China missions of the 16th and 17th centuries introduced Western science and astronomy, then undergoing its own revolution, to China. The scientific revolution brought by the Jesuits coincided with a time when scientific innovation had declined in China:

For over a century, Jesuits like Michele Ruggieri, Matteo Ricci, Diego de Pantoja, Philippe Couplet, Michal Boym, and François Noël refined translations and disseminated Chinese knowledge, culture, history, and philosophy to Europe. Their Latin works popularized the name "Confucius" and had considerable influence on the Deists and other Enlightenment thinkers, some of whom were intrigued by the Jesuits' attempts to reconcile Confucian morality with Catholicism.

Upon the arrival of the Franciscans and other monastic orders, Jesuit accommodation of Chinese culture and rituals led to the long-running Chinese Rites controversy. Despite the personal testimony of the Kangxi Emperor and many Jesuit converts that Chinese veneration of ancestors and Confucius was a nonreligious token of respect, 's papal decree  ruled that such behavior constituted impermissible forms of idolatry and superstition in 1704; his legate Tournon and Bishop Charles Maigrot of Fujian, tasked with presenting this finding to the Kangxi Emperor, displayed such extreme ignorance that the emperor mandated the expulsion of Christian missionaries unable to abide by the terms of Ricci's Chinese catechism. Tournon's summary and automatic excommunication for any violators of Clement's decree—upheld by the 1715 bull —led to the swift collapse of all the missions in China; the last Jesuits were finally expelled after 1721.

Ireland 
The first Jesuit school in Ireland was established at Limerick by the Apostolic Visitor of the Holy See, David Wolfe. Wolfe had been sent to Ireland by Pope Pius IV with the concurrence of the third Jesuit General, Diego Laynez. He was charged with setting up grammar schools "as a remedy against the profound ignorance of the people".

Wolfe's mission in Ireland initially concentrated on setting the sclerotic Irish Church on a sound footing, introducing the Tridentine Reforms and finding suitable men to fill vacant Sees. He established a house of religious women in Limerick who were known as the Menabochta (mna bochta, poor women)  and in 1565 preparations began for establishing a school at Limerick.

At his instigation, Richard Creagh, a priest of the Diocese of Limerick, was persuaded to accept the vacant Archdiocese of Armagh, and was consecrated at Rome in 1564. 

This early Limerick school operated in difficult circumstances. In April 1566, Good sent a detailed report to Rome of his activities via the Portuguese Jesuits. He informed the Jesuit General that he and Daniel had arrived at Limerick city two years beforehand and their situation there had been perilous. Both had arrived in the city in very bad health, but had recovered due to the kindness of the people. They established contact with Wolfe, but were only able to meet with him at night, as the English authorities were attempting to arrest the Legate. Wolfe charged them initially with teaching to the boys of Limerick, with an emphasis on religious instruction, and Good translated the catechism from Latin into English for this purpose. They remained in the city for eight months, before moving to Kilmallock in December 1565 under the protection of the Earl of Desmond, where they lived in more comfort than the primitive conditions they experienced in the city. However they were unable to support themselves at Kilmallock and three months later they returned to the city in Easter 1566, and strangely set up their house in accommodation owned by the Lord Deputy of Ireland, which was conveyed to them by certain influential friends.

They recommenced teaching at Castle Lane, and imparting the sacraments, though their activities were restricted by the arrival of Royal Commissioners. Good reported that as he was an Englishman, English officials in the city cultivated him and he was invited to dine with them on a number of occasions, though he was warned to exercise prudence and avoid promoting the Petrine Primacy and the priority of the Mass amongst the sacraments with his students and congregation, and that his sermons should emphasize obedience to secular princes if he wished to avoid arrest.

The number of scholars in their care was very small. An early example of a school play in Ireland is sent in one of Good's reports, which was performed on the Feast of St. John in 1566. The school was conducted in one large aula, but the students were divided into distinct classes. Good gives a highly detailed report of the curriculum taught and the top class studied the first and second parts of Johannes Despauterius's Commentarli grammatici, and read a few letters of Cicero or the dialogues of Frusius (André des Freux, SJ). The second class committed Donatus' texts in Latin to memory and read dialogues as well as works by Ēvaldus Gallus. Students in the third class learned Donatus by heart, though translated into English rather than through Latin. Young boys in the fourth class were taught to read. Progress was slow because there were too few teachers to conduct classes simultaneously.

In the spirit of Ignatius's Roman College founded 14 years before, no fee was requested from pupils, though as a result the two Jesuits lived in very poor conditions and were very overworked with teaching and administering the sacraments to the public. In late 1568 the Castle Lane School, in the presence of Daniel and Good, was attacked and looted by government agents sent by Sir Thomas Cusack during the pacification of Munster. The political and religious climate had become more uncertain in the lead up to Pope Pius V's formal excommunication of Queen Elizabeth I, which resulted in a new wave of repression of Catholicism in England and Ireland. At the end of 1568 the Anglican Bishop of Meath, Hugh Brady, was sent to Limerick charged with a Royal Commission to seek out and expel the Jesuits. Daniel was immediately ordered to quit the city and went to Lisbon, where he resumed his studies with the Portuguese Jesuits. Good moved on to Clonmel, before establishing himself at Youghal until 1577.

In 1571, after Wolfe had been captured and imprisoned at Dublin Castle, Daniel persuaded the Portuguese Province to agree a surety for the ransom of Wolfe, who was quickly banished on release. Daniel returned to Ireland the following year, but was immediately captured and incriminating documents were found on his person, which were taken as proof of his involvement with the rebellious cousin of the Earl of Desmond, James Fitzmaurice and a Spanish plot. He was removed from Limerick, taken to Cork "just as if he were a thief or noted evildoer". After being court-martialled by the Lord President of Munster, Sir John Perrot, he was sentenced to be hanged, drawn, and quartered for treason and refused pardon in return for swearing the Act of Supremacy. His execution was carried out on 25 October 1572 and a report of it was sent by Fitzmaurice to the Jesuit Superior General in 1576, where he said that Daniel was "cruelly killed because of me".

With Daniel dead and Wolfe dismissed, the Irish Jesuit foundation suffered a severe setback. Good is recorded as resident at Rome by 1577 and in 1586 the seizure of Earl of Desmond's estates resulted in a new permanent Protestant plantation in Munster, making the continuation of the Limerick school impossible for a time. It was not until the early 1600s that the Jesuit mission could again re-establish itself in the city, though the Jesuits kept a low profile existence in lodgings here and there. For instance a mission led by Fr. Nicholas Leinagh re-established itself at Limerick in 1601, though the Jesuit presence in the city numbered no more than 1 or 2 at a time in the years immediately following.

In 1604, the Lord President of Munster, Sir Henry Brouncker - at Limerick, ordered all Jesuits from the city and Province, and offered £7 to anyone willing to betray a Jesuit priest to the authorities, and £5 for a Seminarian. Jesuit houses and schools throughout the Province, in the years thereafter, were subject to periodic crackdown and the occasional destruction of schools, imprisonment of teachers and the levying of heavy money penalties on parents are recorded in publications of the time. In 1615-17 the Royal Visitation Books, written up by Thomas Jones, the Anglican Archbishop of Dublin, records the suppression of Jesuit schools at Waterford, Limerick and Galway. Nevertheless, spite of this occasional persecution, the Jesuits were able to exert a degree of discreet influence within the Province and city. For instance in 1606, largely through their efforts, a Catholic named Christopher Holywood was elected Mayor of the city. Four years earlier the resident Jesuit had raised a sum of "200 cruzados" for the purpose of founding a hospital in the city, though the project was disrupted by a severe outbreak of plague and repression by the Lord President

The principal activities of the Order within the city at this time were devoted to preaching, administration of the sacraments and teaching. The School opened and closed intermittently in or around the area of Castle Lane, near Lahiffy's lane. During demolition work Stones marked I.H.S., 1642 and 1609 were, in the 19th century, found inserted in a wall behind a tan yard near St Mary's Chapel which, according to Lenihan, were thought to mark the site of an early Jesuit School and Oratory. This building, at other times, had also functioned as a dance house and candle factory.

For much of the 17th century, the Limerick Jesuit foundation established a more permanent and stable presence and the Jesuit Annals record a 'flourishing' school at Limerick in the 1640s. During the Confederacy the Jesuits had been able to go about their business unhindered and were invited to preach publicly from the pulpit of St. Mary's Cathedral on 4 occasions. Cardinal Rinuccini wrote to the Jesuit General in Rome praising the work of the Rector of the Limerick College, Fr. William O'Hurley, who was aided by Fr. Thomas Burke. However just a few years later, during the Protectorate era, only 18 of the Jesuits resident in Ireland managed to avoid capture by the authorities. Lenihan records that the Limerick College SJ, in 1656, moved to a hut in the middle of a bog which was difficult for the authorities to find. This foundation was headed up by Fr. Nicholas Punch who was aided by Frs. Maurice Patrick, Piers Creagh and James Forde and the school attracted a large number of students from around the locality.

At the Restoration of Charles II the school moved back to Castle Lane, and remained largely undisturbed for the next 40 years, until the surrender of the city to Williamite forces in 1692. In 1671, Dr. James Douley was appointed Vicar Apostolic of Limerick and during his visitation to the Diocese reported to the Holy See that the Jesuits had a house and "taught schools with great fruit, instructing the youth in the articles of faith and good morals." Dr Douley also noted that this and other Catholic schools operating in the Diocese were also attended by local Protestants.

The Jesuit presence in Ireland, in the so-called Penal era after the Battle of the Boyne, ebbed and flowed. By 1700 they were only 6 or 7, recovering to 25 by 1750. Small Jesuit houses and schools existed at Athlone, Carrick-on-Suir, Cashel, Clonmel, Kilkenny, Waterford, New Ross, Wexford, and Drogheda, as well as Dublin and Galway. At Limerick there appears to have been a long hiatus following the defeat of the Jacobite forces and Begley states that Fr. Thomas O'Gorman was the first Jesuit to return to Limerick after the siege, arriving in 1728 and he took up residence in Jail Lane, near the Castle in the Englishtown. There he opened a school to "impart the rudiments of the classics to the better class youth of the city." Fr. O'Gorman left in 1737 and was succeeded by Fr. John McGrath. Next came Fr. James McMahon, who was a nephew of the Primate of Armagh, Hugh MacMahon. Fr. McMahon lived at Limerick for thirteen years until his death in 1751. In 1746 Father Joseph Morony was sent from Bordeaux to join Father McMahon and the others. Fr. Morony remained at the Jail Lane site teaching at what Begley states was a "high class school" until 1773 when he was ordered to close the School and Oratory following the papal suppression of the Society of Jesus, 208 years after its foundation by Wolfe. Fr Morony then went to live in Dublin and worked as a secular priest.

Despite the efforts of the Castle authorities and English government the Limerick school managed to survive the Protestant Reformation, the Cromwellian invasion and Williamite Wars, and subsequent Penal Laws. It was finally forced to close, not for religious or confessional reasons, but due to the political difficulties of the Jesuit Order elsewhere.

Following the restoration of the Society of Jesus in 1814, the Jesuits gradually re-established a number of their schools throughout the country, starting with foundations at Kildare and Dublin. They returned to Limerick at the invitation of the Bishop of Limerick, Dr. John Ryan, in 1859 and also re-established a school at Galway in the same year.

Canada

During the French colonisation of New France in the 17th century, Jesuits played an active role in North America. Samuel de Champlain established the foundations of the French colony at Québec in 1608. The native tribes that inhabited modern day Ontario, Québec, and the areas around Lake Simcoe and Georgian Bay were the Montagnais, the Algonquins, and the Huron. Champlain believed that these had souls to be saved, so in 1614 he obtained the Recollects, a reform branch of the Franciscans in France, to convert the native inhabitants. In 1624 the French Recollects realized the magnitude of their task and sent a delegate to France to invite the Society of Jesus to help with this mission. The invitation was accepted, and Jesuits Jean de Brébeuf, Ennemond Masse, and Charles Lalemant arrived in Quebec in 1625. Lalemant is considered to have been the first author of one of the Jesuit Relations of New France, which chronicled their evangelization during the 17th century.

The Jesuits became involved in the Huron mission in 1626 and lived among the Huron peoples. Brébeuf learned the native language and created the first Huron language dictionary. Outside conflict forced the Jesuits to leave New France in 1629 when Quebec was surrendered to the English. But in 1632 Quebec was returned to the French under the Treaty of Saint Germain-en-Laye and the Jesuits returned to Huron territory, modern Huronia. After a series of epidemics of European-introduced diseases beginning in 1634, some Huron began to mistrust the Jesuits and accused them of being sorcerers casting spells from their books.

In 1639, Jesuit Jerome Lalemant decided that the missionaries among the Hurons needed a local residence and established Sainte-Marie near present day Midland, Ontario, which was meant to be a replica of European society. It became the Jesuit headquarters and an important part of Canadian history. Throughout most of the 1640s the Jesuits had modest success, establishing five chapels in Huronia and baptising more than one thousand Huron out of a population which may have exceeded 20,000 before the epidemics of the 1630s. However, the Iroquois of New York, rivals of the Hurons, grew jealous of the Hurons' wealth and control of the fur trade system and attacked Huron villages in 1648. They killed missionaries and burned villages, and the Hurons scattered. Both Jean de Brébeuf and Gabriel Lalemant were tortured and killed in the Iroquois raids; they have been canonized as martyrs in the Catholic Church. The Jesuit Paul Ragueneau burned down Sainte-Marie instead of allowing the Iroquois the satisfaction of destroying it. By late June 1649, the French and some Christian Hurons built Sainte-Marie II on Christian Island (Isle de Saint-Joseph). However, facing starvation, lack of supplies, and constant threats of Iroquois attack, the small Sainte-Marie II was abandoned in June 1650; the remaining Christian Hurons and Jesuits departed for Quebec and Ottawa. As a result of the Iroquois raids and outbreak of disease, many missionaries, traders, and soldiers died. Today, the Huron tribe, also known as the Wyandot, have a First Nations reserve in Quebec, Canada, and three major settlements in the United States.

After the collapse of the Huron nation, the Jesuits undertook the task of converting the Iroquois, something they had attempted in 1642 with little success. In 1653 the Iroquois nation had a fallout with the Dutch. They then signed a peace treaty with the French and a mission was established. The Iroquois soon turned on the French again. In 1658, the Jesuits were having little success and were under constant threat of being tortured or killed, but continued their effort until 1687 when they abandoned their permanent posts in the Iroquois homeland.

By 1700, Jesuits turned to maintaining Quebec, Montreal, and Ottawa without establishing new posts. During the Seven Years' War, Quebec was captured by the British in 1759 and New France came under British control. The British barred the immigration of more Jesuits to New France, and by 1763, only 21 Jesuits were stationed in New France. By 1773 only 11 Jesuits remained. During the same year the British crown declared that the Society of Jesus in New France was dissolved.

The dissolution of the order left in place substantial estates and investments, amounting to an income of approximately £5,000 a year, and the Council for the Affairs of the Province of Quebec, later succeeded by the Legislative Assembly of Quebec, assumed the task of allocating the funds to suitable recipients, chiefly schools.

The Jesuit mission in Quebec was re-established in 1842. There were a number of Jesuit colleges founded in the decades following; one of these colleges evolved into present-day Laval University.

United States

In the United States, the order is best known for its missions to the Native Americans in the early 17th century, its network of colleges and universities, and (in Europe before 1773) its politically conservative role in the Catholic Counter Reformation.

The Society of Jesus, in the United States, is organized into geographic provinces, each of which being headed by a provincial superior. Today, there are four Jesuit provinces operating in the United States: the USA East, USA Central and Southern, USA Midwest, and USA West Provinces. At their height, there were ten provinces. Though there had been mergers in the past, a major reorganization of the provinces began in early 21st century, with the aim of consolidating into four provinces by 2020.

Ecuador
It is among the best-known churches in Quito because of its large central nave, which is profusely decorated with gold leaf, gilded plaster and wood carvings. Inspired by two Roman Jesuit churches – the Chiesa del Gesù (1580) and the Chiesa di Sant'Ignazio di Loyola (1650) –  is one of the most significant works of Spanish Baroque architecture in South America and Quito's most ornate church.

Over the 160 years of its construction, the architects of  incorporated elements of four architectural styles, although the Baroque is the most prominent. Mudéjar (Moorish) influence is seen in the geometrical figures on the pillars; the Churrigueresque characterizes much of the ornate decoration, especially in the interior walls; finally the Neoclassical style adorns the Chapel of Saint Mariana de Jesús (in early years a winery).

Mexico

The Jesuits in New Spain distinguished themselves in several ways. They had high standards for acceptance to the order and many years of training. They attracted the patronage of elite families whose sons they educated in rigorous newly founded Jesuit  ("colleges"), including Colegio de San Pedro y San Pablo, Colegio de San Ildefonso, and the Colegio de San Francisco Javier, Tepozotlan. Those same elite families hoped that a son with a vocation to the priesthood would be accepted as a Jesuit. Jesuits were also zealous in evangelization of the indigenous, particularly on the northern frontiers.

To support their  and members of the Society of Jesus, the Jesuits acquired landed estates that were run with the best-practices for generating income in that era. A number of these haciendas were donated by wealthy 
elites. The donation of a hacienda to the Jesuits was the spark igniting a conflict between 17th-century bishop of Puebla Don Juan de Palafox and the Jesuit colegio in that city. Since the Jesuits resisted paying the tithe on their estates, this donation effectively took revenue out of the church hierarchy's pockets by removing it from the tithe rolls.

Many of Jesuit haciendas were huge, with Palafox asserting that just two colleges owned 300,000 head of sheep, whose wool was transformed locally in Puebla to cloth; six sugar plantations worth a million pesos and generating an income of 100,000 pesos. The immense Jesuit hacienda of Santa Lucía produced , the fermented juice of the agave cactus whose main consumers were the lower classes and indigenous peoples in Spanish cities. Although most haciendas had a free work force of permanent or seasonal labourers, the Jesuit haciendas in Mexico had a significant number of black slaves.

The Jesuits operated their properties as an integrated unit with the larger Jesuit order; thus revenues from haciendas funded their . Jesuits did significantly expand missions to the indigenous in the northern frontier area and a number were martyred, but the crown supported those missions. Mendicant orders that had real estate were less economically integrated, so that some individual houses were wealthy while others struggled economically. The Franciscans, who were founded as an order embracing poverty, did not accumulate real estate, unlike the Augustinians and Dominicans in Mexico.

The Jesuits engaged in conflict with the episcopal hierarchy over the question of payment of tithes, the ten percent tax on agriculture levied on landed estates for support of the church hierarchy from bishops and cathedral chapters to parish priests. Since the Jesuits were the largest religious order holding real estate, surpassing the Dominicans and Augustinians who had accumulated significant property, this was no small matter. They argued that they were exempt, due to special pontifical privileges. In the mid-17th century, bishop of Puebla, Don Juan de Palafox took on the Jesuits over this matter and was so soundly defeated that he was recalled to Spain, where he became the bishop of the minor diocese of Osma.

As elsewhere in the Spanish empire, the Jesuits were expelled from Mexico in 1767. Their haciendas were sold off and their colegios and missions in Baja California were taken over by other orders. Exiled Mexican-born Jesuit Francisco Javier Clavijero wrote an important history of Mexico while in Italy, a basis for creole patriotism. Andrés Cavo also wrote an important text on Mexican history that Carlos María de Bustamante published in the early nineteenth-century. An earlier Jesuit who wrote about the history of Mexico was Diego Luis de Motezuma (1619–99), a descendant of the Aztec monarchs of Tenochtitlan. Motezuma's  was completed in 1696. He "aimed to show that Mexican emperors were a legitimate dynasty in the 17th-century in the European sense".

The Jesuits were allowed to return to Mexico in 1840 when General Antonio López de Santa Anna was once more president of Mexico. Their re-introduction to Mexico was "to assist in the education of the poorer classes and much of their property was restored to them".

Northern Spanish America

The Jesuits arrived in the Viceroyalty of Peru by 1571; it was a key area of the Spanish empire, with not only dense indigenous populations but also huge deposits of silver at Potosí. A major figure in the first wave of Jesuits was José de Acosta (1540–1600), whose book  (1590) introduced Europeans to Spain's American empire via fluid prose and keen observation and explanation, based on 15 years in Peru and some time in New Spain (Mexico). Viceroy of Peru Don Francisco de Toledo urged the Jesuits to evangelize the indigenous peoples of Peru, wanting to put them in charge of parishes, but Acosta adhered to the Jesuit position that they were not subject to the jurisdiction of bishops and to catechize in indigenous parishes would bring them into conflict with the bishops. For that reason, the Jesuits in Peru focused on education of elite men rather than the indigenous populations.

To minister to newly arrived African slaves, Alonso de Sandoval (1576–1651) worked at the port of Cartagena de Indias. In his treatise, he did not condemn slavery or the ill-treatment of slaves, but sought to instruct fellow Jesuits to this ministry and describe how he catechized the slaves.

Rafael Ferrer was the first Jesuit of Quito to explore and found missions in the upper Amazon regions of South America from 1602 to 1610, which belonged to the Audiencia (high court) of Quito that was a part of the Viceroyalty of Peru until it was transferred to the newly created Viceroyalty of New Granada in 1717. In 1602, Ferrer began to explore the Aguarico, Napo, and Marañon rivers (Sucumbios region, in what is today Ecuador and Peru), and between 1604 and 1605 set up missions among the Cofane natives. He was martyred by an apostate native in 1610.

In 1639, the Audiencia of Quito organized an expedition to renew its exploration of the Amazon river and the Quito Jesuit (Jesuita Quiteño) Cristóbal de Acuña was a part of this expedition. The expedition disembarked from the Napo river 16 February 1639 and arrived in what is today Pará Brazil on the banks of the Amazon river on 12 December 1639. In 1641, Acuña published in Madrid a memoir of his expedition to the Amazon river entitled , which for academics became a fundamental reference on the Amazon region.

In 1637, the Jesuits Gaspar Cugia and Lucas de la Cueva from Quito began establishing the Mainas missions in territories on the banks of the Marañón River, around the Pongo de Manseriche region, close to the Spanish settlement of Borja. Between 1637 and 1652 there were 14 missions established along the Marañón River and its southern tributaries, the Huallaga and the Ucayali rivers. Jesuit Lucas de la Cueva and Raimundo de Santacruz opened up two new routes of communication with Quito, through the Pastaza and Napo rivers.

Between 1637 and 1715, Samuel Fritz founded 38 missions along the length of the Amazon river, between the Napo and Negro rivers, that were called the Omagua Missions. These missions were continually attacked by the Brazilian Bandeirantes beginning in the year 1705. In 1768, the only Omagua mission that was left was San Joaquin de Omaguas, since it had been moved to a new location on the Napo river away from the Bandeirantes.

In the immense territory of Maynas, the Jesuits of Quito made contact with a number of indigenous tribes which spoke 40 different languages, and founded a total of 173 Jesuit missions encompassing 150,000 inhabitants. Because of the constant epidemics (smallpox and measles) and warfare with other tribes and the Bandeirantes, the total number of Jesuit Missions were reduced to 40 by 1744. The Jesuit missions offered the indigenous people Christianity, iron tools, and a small degree of protection from the slavers and the colonists. In exchange, the indigenous had to submit to Jesuit discipline and adopt, at least superficially, a life style foreign to their experience. The population of the missions was only sustained by frequent expeditions into the jungle by Jesuits, soldiers, and Christian Indians to capture indigenous people and force them to return or to settle in the missions. At the time when the Jesuits were expelled from Spanish America in 1767, the Jesuits registered 36 missions run by 25 Jesuits in the Audiencia of Quito – 6 in the Napo and Aguarico Missions and 19 in the Pastaza and Iquitos Missions, with a population at 20,000 inhabitants.

Paraguay

The Guaraní people of eastern Paraguay and neighboring Brazil and Argentina were in crisis in the early 17th century. Recurrent epidemics of European diseases had reduced their population by up 50 percent and the forced labor of the encomiendas by the Spanish and mestizo colonists had made virtual slaves of many. Franciscan missionaries began establishing missions called reductions in the 1580s. The first Jesuits arrived in Asunción in 1588 and founded their first mission (or reduction) of San Ignacio Guazú in 1609. The objectives of the Jesuits were to make Christians of the Guaraní, impose European values and customs (which were regarded as essential to a Christian life), and isolate and protect the Guaraní from European colonists and slavers. "

In addition to recurrent epidemics, the Guaraní were threatened by the slave-raiding Bandeirantes from Brazil, who captured natives and sold them as slaves to work in sugar plantations or as concubines and household servants. Having depleted native populations near São Paulo, they discovered the richly populated Jesuit missions. Initially, the missions had few defenses against the slavers and thousands of Guaraní were captured and enslaved. About 10,000 of 30,000 Guaraní in the missions chose to accompany the Jesuits. In 1641 and 1642, armed by the Jesuits, Guaraní armies defeated the Bandeirantes and ended the worst of the slave trade in their region. From this point on the Jesuit missions enjoyed growth and prosperity, punctuated by epidemics. At the peak of their importance in 1732, the Jesuits presided over 141,000 Guaraní (including a sprinkling of other peoples) who lived in about 30 missions.

The opinions of historians differ with regard to the Jesuit missions. The missions are much-romanticized with the Guaraní portrayed as innocent children of nature and the Jesuits as their wise and benevolent guides to an earthly utopia. "Proponents...highlight that the Jesuits protected the Indians from exploitation and preserved the Guaraní language and other aspects of indigenous culture."  "By means of religion," wrote the 18th century philosopher d'Alembert, "the Jesuits established a monarchical authority in Paraguay, founded solely on their powers of persuasion and on their lenient methods of government. Masters of the country, they rendered happy the people under their sway." Voltaire called the Jesuit missions "a triumph of humanity".

To the contrary the detractors say that 'the Jesuits took away the Indians' freedom, forced them to radically change their lifestyle, physically abused them, and subjected them to disease." Moreover, the missions were inefficient and their economic success "depended on subsidies from the Jesuit order, special protection and privileges from the Crown, and the lack of competition" The Jesuits are portrayed as "exploiters" who "sought to create a kingdom independent of the Spanish and Portuguese Crowns."

The Comunero Revolt (1721 to 1735) was a serious protest by Spanish and mestizo Paraguayans against the Jesuit missions. The residents of Paraguay violently protested the pro-Jesuit government of Paraguay, Jesuit control of Guaraní labor, and what they regarded as unfair competition for the market for products such as yerba mate. Although the revolt ultimately failed and the missions remained intact, the Jesuits were expelled from institutions they had created in Asunción. In 1756, the Guaraní protested the relocation of seven missions, fighting (and losing) a brief war with both the Spanish and Portuguese. The Jesuits were accused of inciting the Guaraní to rebel. In 1767, Charles III of Spain (1759–88) expelled the Jesuits from the Americas. The expulsion was part of an effort in the Bourbon Reforms to assert more Spanish control over its American colonies. In total, 78 Jesuits departed from the missions leaving behind 89,000 Guaraní in 30 missions.

Colonial Brazil

Tomé de Sousa, first Governor General of Brazil, brought the first group of Jesuits to the colony. The Jesuits were officially supported by the King, who instructed Tomé de Sousa to give them all the support needed to Christianize the indigenous peoples.

The first Jesuits, guided by Manuel da Nóbrega, Juan de Azpilcueta Navarro, Leonardo Nunes, and later José de Anchieta, established the first Jesuit missions in Salvador and in São Paulo dos Campos de Piratininga, the settlement that gave rise to the city of São Paulo. Nóbrega and Anchieta were instrumental in the defeat of the French colonists of France Antarctique by managing to pacify the Tamoio natives, who had previously fought the Portuguese. The Jesuits took part in the foundation of the city of Rio de Janeiro in 1565.

The success of the Jesuits in converting the indigenous peoples is linked to their efforts to understand the native cultures, especially their languages. The first grammar of the Tupi language was compiled by José de Anchieta and printed in Coimbra in 1595. The Jesuits often gathered the aborigines in communities (the Jesuit Reductions) where the natives worked for the community and were evangelised.

The Jesuits had frequent disputes with other colonists who wanted to enslave the natives. The action of the Jesuits saved many natives from being enslaved by Europeans, but also disturbed their ancestral way of life and inadvertently helped spread infectious diseases against which the aborigines had no natural defenses. Slave labor and trade were essential for the economy of Brazil and other American colonies, and the Jesuits usually did not object to the enslavement of African peoples, but rather critiqued the conditions of slavery.  In cases where individual Jesuit priests criticised the institution of African slavery, they were censored and sent back to Europe.

Suppression and restoration

The Suppression of the Jesuits in Portugal, France, the Two Sicilies, Parma, and the Spanish Empire by 1767 was deeply troubling to Pope Clement XIII, the society's defender. On 21 July 1773 his successor, Pope Clement XIV, issued the papal brief , decreeing:

The suppression was carried out on political grounds in all countries except Prussia for a time, and Russia, where Catherine the Great had forbidden its promulgation. Because millions of Catholics (including many Jesuits) lived in the Polish provinces recently part-annexed by the Kingdom of Prussia, the Society was able to maintain its continuity and carry on its work all through the stormy period of suppression. Subsequently, Pope Pius VI granted formal permission for the continuation of the society in Russia and Poland, with Stanisław Czerniewicz elected superior of the province in 1782. He was followed by Gabriel Lenkiewicz, Franciszek Kareu and Gabriel Gruber until 1805, all elected locally as Temporary Vicars General. Pope Pius VII had resolved during his captivity in France to restore the Jesuits universally, and on his return to Rome he did so without much delay. On 7 August 1814, with the bull , he reversed the suppression of the society, and therewith another Polish Jesuit, Tadeusz Brzozowski, who had been elected as Superior in Russia in 1805, acquired universal jurisdiction. On his death in 1820 the Jesuits were expelled from Russia by tsar Alexander I.

The period following the Restoration of the Jesuits in 1814 was marked by tremendous growth, as evidenced by the large number of Jesuit colleges and universities established during the 19th century. During this time in the United States, 22 of the society's 28 universities were founded or taken over by the Jesuits. It has been suggested that the experience of suppression had served to heighten orthodoxy among the Jesuits. While this claim is debatable, Jesuits were generally supportive of papal authority within the church, and some members became associated with the Ultramontanist movement and the declaration of Papal Infallibility in 1870.

In Switzerland, the constitution was modified and Jesuits were banished in 1848, following the defeat of the Sonderbund Catholic defence alliance. The ban was lifted on 20 May 1973, when 54.9 per cent of voters accepted a referendum modifying the Constitution.

Early 20th century 
In the Constitution of Norway from 1814, a relic from the earlier anti-Catholic laws of Denmark–Norway, Paragraph 2, known as the Jesuit clause, originally read: "The Evangelical-Lutheran religion remains the public religion of the State. Those inhabitants, who confess thereto, are bound to raise their children to the same. Jesuits and monastic orders are not permitted. Jews are still prohibited from entry to the Realm." Jews were first allowed into the realm in 1851 after the famous Norwegian poet Henrik Wergeland had campaigned for it. Monastic orders were permitted in 1897, but the ban on Jesuits was only lifted in 1956.

Republican Spain in the 1930s passed laws banning the Jesuits on grounds that they were obedient to a power different from the state. Pope Pius XI wrote about this: "It was an expression of a soul deeply hostile to God and the Catholic religion, to have disbanded the Religious Orders that had taken a vow of obedience to an authority different from the legitimate authority of the State. In this way it was sought to do away with the Society of Jesus – which can well glory in being one of the soundest auxiliaries of the Chair of Saint Peter – with the hope, perhaps, of then being able with less difficulty to overthrow in the near future, the Christian faith and morale in the heart of the Spanish nation, which gave to the Church of God the grand and glorious figure of Ignatius Loyola."

Post-Vatican II
The 20th century witnessed both growth and decline of the order. Following a trend within the Catholic priesthood at large, Jesuit numbers peaked in the 1950s and have declined steadily since. Meanwhile, the number of Jesuit institutions has grown considerably, due in large part to a post–Vatican II focus on the establishment of Jesuit secondary schools in inner-city areas and an increase in voluntary lay groups inspired in part by the Spiritual Exercises. Among the notable Jesuits of the 20th century, John Courtney Murray was called one of the "architects of the Second Vatican Council" and drafted what eventually became the council's endorsement of religious freedom, .

In Latin America, the Jesuits had significant influence in the development of liberation theology, a movement that was controversial in the Catholic community after the negative assessment of it by Pope John Paul II in 1984.

Under Superior General Pedro Arrupe, social justice and the preferential option for the poor emerged as dominant themes of the work of the Jesuits. When Arrupe was paralyzed by a stroke in 1981, Pope John Paul II, not entirely pleased with the progressive turn of the Jesuits, took the unusual step of appointing the venerable and aged Paolo Dezza for an interim to oversee "the authentic renewal of the Church", instead of the progressive American priest Vincent O'Keefe whom Arrupe had preferred. In 1983 John Paul gave leave for the Jesuits to appoint a successor to Arrupe.

On 16 November 1989, six Jesuit priests (Ignacio Ellacuría, Segundo Montes, Ignacio Martín-Baró, Joaquin López y López, Juan Ramon Moreno, and Amado López), Elba Ramos their housekeeper, and Celia Marisela Ramos her daughter, were murdered by the Salvadoran military on the campus of the University of Central America in San Salvador, El Salvador, because they had been labeled as subversives by the government. The assassinations galvanized the society's peace and justice movements, including annual protests at the Western Hemisphere Institute for Security Cooperation at Fort Benning, Georgia, United States, where several of the assassins had been trained under US government sponsorship.

On 21 February 2001, the Jesuit priest Avery Dulles, an internationally known author, lecturer, and theologian, was created a cardinal of the Catholic Church by Pope John Paul II. The son of former Secretary of State John Foster Dulles, Avery Dulles was long known for his carefully reasoned argumentation and fidelity to the teaching office of the church. An author of 22 books and over 700 theological articles, Dulles died on 12 December 2008 at Fordham University, where he had taught for twenty years as the Laurence J. McGinley Professor of Religion and Society. He was, at his passing, one of ten Jesuit cardinals in the Catholic Church.

In 2002, Boston College president and Jesuit priest William P. Leahy initiated the Church in the 21st Century program as a means of moving the church "from crisis to renewal". The initiative has provided the society with a platform for examining issues brought about by the worldwide Catholic sex abuse cases, including the priesthood, celibacy, sexuality, women's roles, and the role of the laity.

In April 2005, Thomas J. Reese, editor of the American Jesuit weekly magazine America, resigned at the request of the society. The move was widely published in the media as the result of pressure from the Vatican, following years of criticism by the Congregation for the Doctrine of the Faith on articles touching subjects such as HIV/AIDS, religious pluralism, homosexuality, and the right of life for the unborn. Following his resignation, Reese spent a year-long sabbatical at Santa Clara University before being named a fellow at the Woodstock Theological Center in Washington, D.C., and later Senior Analyst for the National Catholic Reporter. President Barack Obama appointed him to the United States Commission on International Religious Freedom in 2014 and again in 2016.

On 2 February 2006, Peter Hans Kolvenbach informed members of the Society of Jesus that, with the consent of Pope Benedict XVI, he intended to step down as Superior General in 2008, the year he would turn 80.

On 22 April 2006, Feast of Our Lady, Mother of the Society of Jesus, Pope Benedict XVI greeted thousands of Jesuits on pilgrimage to Rome, and took the opportunity to thank God "for having granted to your Company the gift of men of extraordinary sanctity and of exceptional apostolic zeal such as St Ignatius of Loyola, St Francis Xavier, and Bl Peter Faber". He said "St Ignatius of Loyola was above all a man of God, who gave the first place of his life to God, to his greater glory and his greater service. He was a man of profound prayer, which found its center and its culmination in the daily Eucharistic Celebration."

In May 2006, Benedict XVI also wrote a letter to Superior General Peter Hans Kolvenbach on the occasion of the 50th anniversary of Pope Pius XII's encyclical , on devotion to the Sacred Heart, because the Jesuits have always been "extremely active in the promotion of this essential devotion". In his 3 November 2006 visit to the Pontifical Gregorian University, Benedict XVI cited the university as "one of the greatest services that the Society of Jesus carries out for the universal Church".

The 35th General Congregation of the Society of Jesus convened on 5 January 2008 and elected Adolfo Nicolás as the new Superior General on 19 January 2008. In a letter to the Fathers of the Congregation, Benedict XVI wrote:

In 2013, Jesuit Cardinal Jorge Bergoglio became Pope Francis. Before he became pope, he was appointed bishop when he was in "virtual estrangement from the Jesuits" since he was seen as "an enemy of liberation theology" and viewed by others as "still far too orthodox". He was criticised for colluding with the Argentine junta, while biographers characterised him as working to save the lives of other Jesuits. As a Jesuit pope, he has been stressing discernment over following rules, changing the culture of the clergy to steer away from clericalism and to move toward an ethic of service, i.e to have the "smell of sheep," staying close to the people. After his papal election, the Superior General of the Jesuits Adolfo Nicolás praised Pope Francis as a "brother among brothers".

On 2 October 2016, General Congregation 36 convened in Rome, convoked by Superior General Adolfo Nicolás, who had announced his intention to resign at age 80. On 14 October, the 36th General Congregation of the Society of Jesus elected Arturo Sosa, a Venezuelan, as its thirty-first Superior General.

The General Congregation of Jesuits who elected Arturo Sosa in 2016 asked him to bring to completion the process of discerning Jesuit priorities for the time ahead. Sosa devised a plan that enlisted all Jesuits and their lay collaborators in the process of discernment over a 16-month period. Then in February 2019 he presented the results of the discernment, a list of four priorities for Jesuit ministries for the next ten years.

Pope Francis gave his approval to these priorities, saying that they were in harmony with the church's present priorities and with the programmatic letter of his pontificate, .

Ignatian spirituality

The spirituality practiced by the Jesuits, called Ignatian spirituality, ultimately based on the Catholic faith and the gospels, is drawn from the Constitutions, The Letters, and Autobiography, and most specially from Ignatius' Spiritual Exercises, whose purpose is "to conquer oneself and to regulate one's life in such a way that no decision is made under the influence of any inordinate attachment". The Exercises culminate in a contemplation whereby one develops a facility to "find God in all things".

Formation

The formation (training) of Jesuits seeks to prepare men spiritually, academically, and practically for the ministries they will be called to offer the church and world. Ignatius was strongly influenced by the Renaissance, and he wanted Jesuits to be able to offer whatever ministries were most needed at any given moment and, especially, to be ready to respond to missions (assignments) from the pope. Formation for priesthood normally takes between eight and fourteen years, depending on the man's background and previous education, and final vows are taken several years after that, making Jesuit formation among the longest of any of the religious orders.

Governance of the society
The society is headed by a Superior General with the formal title Praepositus Generalis, Latin for "provost-general", more commonly called Father General. He is elected by the General Congregation for life or until he resigns; he is confirmed by the pope and has absolute authority in running the Society. The current Superior General of the Jesuits is the Venezuelan Arturo Sosa who was elected on 14 October 2016.

The Father General is assisted by "assistants", four of whom are "assistants for provident care" and serve as general advisors and a sort of inner council, and several other regional assistants, each of whom heads an "assistancy", which is either a geographic area (for instance the North American Assistancy) or an area of ministry (for instance higher education). The assistants normally reside with Father General in Rome and along with others form an advisory council to the General. A vicar general and secretary of the society run day-to-day administration. The General is also required to have an admonitor, a confidential advisor whose task is to warn the General honestly and confidentially when he might be acting imprudently or contrary to the church's magisterium. The central staff of the General is known as the Curia.

The society is divided into geographic areas called provinces, each of which is headed by a Provincial Superior, formally called Father Provincial, chosen by the Superior General. He has authority over all Jesuits and ministries in his area, and is assisted by a socius who acts as a sort of secretary and chief of staff. With the approval of the Superior General, the Provincial Superior appoints a novice master and a master of tertians to oversee formation, and rectors of local communities of Jesuits. For better cooperation and apostolic efficacy in each continent, the Jesuit provinces are grouped into six Jesuit Conferences worldwide.

Each Jesuit community within a province is normally headed by a rector who is assisted by a "minister", from the Latin word for "servant", a priest who helps oversee the community's day-to-day needs.

The General Congregation is a meeting of all of the assistants, provincials, and additional representatives who are elected by the professed Jesuits of each province. It meets irregularly and rarely, normally to elect a new superior general and/or to take up some major policy issues for the order. The Superior General meets more regularly with smaller councils composed of just the provincials.

Statistics

, the Jesuits formed the largest single religious order of priests and brothers in the Catholic Church. The Jesuits have experienced a decline in numbers in recent decades. As of 2020, the society had 14,839 members (10,721 priests and 4110 other Jesuits which includes brothers and scholastics). This represents a 59% percent decline since the Second Vatican Council (1965), when the society had a total membership of 36,038, of which 20,301 were priests. This decline is most pronounced in Europe and the Americas, with relatively modest membership gains occurring in Asia and Africa. According to Patrick Reilly of the National Catholic Register, there seems to be no "Pope Francis effect" in counteracting the fall of vocations among the Jesuits. Twenty-eight novices took first vows in the Jesuits in the United States and Haiti in 2019. In September 2019, the superior general of the Jesuits, Arturo Sosa, estimated that by 2034 the number would decrease to about 10,000 Jesuits, with a much younger average age than in 2019, and with a shift away from Europe and into Latin America, Africa, and India.

The society is divided into 83 provinces along with six independent regions and ten dependent regions. On 1 January 2007, members served in 112 nations on six continents with the largest number in India and the US. Their average age was 57.3 years: 63.4 years for priests, 29.9 years for scholastics, and 65.5 years for brothers.

The current Superior General of the Jesuits is Arturo Sosa. The society is characterized by its ministries in the fields of missionary work, human rights, social justice and, most notably, higher education. It operates colleges and universities in various countries around the world and is particularly active in the Philippines and India. In the United States the Jesuits have historical ties to 27 colleges and universities and 61 high schools. The degree to which the Jesuits are involved in the administration of each institution varies. As of September 2018, 15 of the 27 Jesuit universities in the US had non-Jesuit lay presidents. According to a 2014 article in The Atlantic, "the number of Jesuit priests who are active in everyday operations at the schools isn't nearly as high as it once was". Worldwide it runs 322 secondary schools and 172 colleges and universities. A typical conception of the mission of a Jesuit school will often contain such concepts as proposing Christ as the model of human life, the pursuit of excellence in teaching and learning, lifelong spiritual and intellectual growth, and training men and women for others.

Habit and dress
Jesuits do not have an official habit. The society's Constitutions gives the following instructions: "The clothing too should have three characteristics: first, it should be proper; second, conformed to the usage of the country of residence; and third, not contradictory to the poverty we profess." (Const. 577)

Historically, a Jesuit-style cassock which the Jesuits call Soutane became "standard issue": it is similar to a robe which is wrapped around the body and was tied with a cincture, rather than the customary buttoned front. A tuftless biretta (only diocesan clergy wore tufts) and a ferraiolo (cape) completed the look.

Today, most Jesuits in the United States wear the clerical collar and black clothing of ordinary priests.

Controversies

Power-seeking
The Monita Secreta (Secret Instructions of the Jesuits), published in 1612 and in 1614 in Kraków, is alleged to have been written by Claudio Acquaviva, the fifth general of the society, but was probably written by former Jesuit Jerome Zahorowski. It purports to describe the methods to be adopted by Jesuits for the acquisition of greater power and influence for the society and for the Catholic Church. The Catholic Encyclopedia states the book is a forgery, fabricated to ascribe a sinister reputation to the Society of Jesus.

Political intrigue
The Jesuits were temporarily banished from France in 1594 after a man named Jean Châtel tried to assassinate the king of France, Henri IV. Under questioning, Châtel revealed that he had been educated by the Jesuits of the Collège de Clermont. The Jesuits were accused of inspiring Châtel's attack. Two of his former teachers were exiled and a third was hanged. The Collège de Clermont was closed, and the building was confiscated. The Jesuits were banned from France, although this ban was quickly lifted.

In England, Henry Garnet, one of the leading English Jesuits, was hanged for misprision of treason because of his knowledge of the Gunpowder Plot (1605). The Plot was the attempted assassination of James VI and I, his family, and most of the Protestant aristocracy in a single attack, by exploding the Houses of Parliament. Another Jesuit, Oswald Tesimond, managed to escape arrest for his involvement in this plot.

Casuistic justification
Jesuits have been accused of using casuistry to obtain justifications for unjustifiable actions (cf. formulary controversy and Lettres Provinciales, by Blaise Pascal). Hence, the Concise Oxford Dictionary of the English language lists "equivocating" as a secondary denotation of the word "Jesuit". Modern critics of the Society of Jesus include Avro Manhattan, Alberto Rivera, and Malachi Martin, the latter being the author of The Jesuits: The Society of Jesus and the Betrayal of the Roman Catholic Church (1987).

Exclusion of those of Jewish or Muslim ancestry
Although in the first 30 years of the existence of the Society of Jesus there were many Jesuits who were conversos (Catholic-convert Jews), an anti-converso faction led to the Decree de genere (1593) which proclaimed that either Jewish or Muslim ancestry, no matter how distant, was an insurmountable impediment for admission to the Society of Jesus. This new rule was contrary to the original wishes of Ignatius who "said that he would take it as a special grace from our Lord to come from Jewish lineage". The 16th-century Decree de genere was repealed in 1946.

Theological debates
Within the Catholic Church, there has existed a sometimes tense relationship between Jesuits and the Holy See, due to questioning of official church teaching and papal directives, such as those on abortion, birth control, women deacons, homosexuality, and liberation theology. At the same time, Jesuits have been appointed to prominent doctrinal and theological positions in the church; under Pope Benedict XVI, Archbishop Luis Ladaria Ferrer was Secretary of the Congregation for the Doctrine of the Faith who is now, under Pope Francis, the Prefect of this Congregation.

Religious persecution
In the quest to evangelize, Jesuits persecuted people of other religions, including Hindus, Muslims and other Christians. The Goan Inquisition was one among various persecutions that Jesuits were involved in. Voltaire wrote about the Goan Inquisition:

Nazi persecution

The Catholic Church faced persecution in Nazi Germany. Hitler was anticlerical and had particular disdain for the Jesuits. According to John Pollard, the Jesuits' "ethos represented the most intransigent opposition to the philosophy of Nazism", and so the Nazis considered them as one of their most dangerous enemies. A Jesuit college in the city of Innsbruck served as a center for anti-Nazi resistance and was closed down by the Nazis in 1938. Jesuits were a target for Gestapo persecution, and many Jesuit priests were deported to death camps. Jesuits made up the largest contingent of clergy imprisoned in the Priest Barracks of Dachau Concentration Camp. Vincent Lapomarda lists some 30 Jesuits as having died at Dachau. Of the total of 152 Jesuits murdered by the Nazis across Europe, 43 died in the death camps and an additional 27 died from captivity or its results.

The Superior General of Jesuits at the outbreak of war was Wlodzimierz Ledóchowski, a Pole. The Nazi persecution of the Catholic Church in Poland was particularly severe. Lapomarda wrote that Ledóchowski helped "stiffen the general attitude of the Jesuits against the Nazis" and that he permitted Vatican Radio to carry on its campaign against the Nazis in Poland. Vatican Radio was run by the Jesuit Filippo Soccorsi and spoke out against Nazi oppression, particularly with regard to Poland and to Vichy-French anti-Semitism.

Several Jesuits were prominent in the small German Resistance. Among the central membership of the Kreisau Circle of the Resistance were the Jesuit priests Augustin Rösch, Alfred Delp, and Lothar König. The Bavarian Jesuit Provincial, Augustin Rosch, ended the war on death row for his role in the July Plot to overthrow Hitler. Another non-military German Resistance group, dubbed the "Frau Solf Tea Party" by the Gestapo, included the Jesuit priest Friedrich Erxleben.  The German Jesuit Robert Leiber acted as intermediary between Pius XII and the German Resistance.

Among the Jesuit victims of the Nazis, Germany's Rupert Mayer has been beatified. Mayer was a Bavarian Jesuit who clashed with the Nazis as early as 1923. Continuing his critique following Hitler's rise to power, Mayer was imprisoned in 1939 and sent to Sachsenhausen death camp. As his health declined, the Nazis feared the creation of a martyr and sent him to the Abbey of Ettal in 1940. There he continued to give sermons and lectures against the evils of the Nazi régime, until his death in 1945.

Rescue efforts during the Holocaust

In his history of the heroes of the Holocaust, the Jewish historian Martin Gilbert notes that in every country under German occupation, priests played a major part in rescuing Jews, and that the Jesuits were one of the Catholic Orders that hid Jewish children in monasteries and schools to protect them from the Nazis. Fourteen Jesuit priests have been formally recognized by Yad Vashem, the Holocaust Martyrs' and Heroes' Remembrance Authority in Jerusalem, for risking their lives to save Jews during the Holocaust of World War II: Roger Braun (1910–1981) of France, Pierre Chaillet (1900–1972) of France, Jean-Baptist De Coster (1896–1968) of Belgium, Jean Fleury (1905–1982) of France, Emile Gessler (1891–1958) of Belgium, Jean-Baptiste Janssens (1889–1964) of Belgium, Alphonse Lambrette (1884–1970) of Belgium, Emile Planckaert (1906–2006) of France, Jacob Raile (1894–1949) of Hungary, Henri Revol (1904–1992) of France, Adam Sztark (1907–1942) of Poland, Henri Van Oostayen (1906–1945) of Belgium, Ioannes Marangas (1901–1989) of Greece, and Raffaele de Chantuz Cubbe (1904–1983) of Italy.

Several other Jesuits are known to have rescued or given refuge to Jews during that period. A plaque commemorating the 152 Jesuit priests who gave their lives during the Holocaust was installed in April 2007 at the Jesuits' Rockhurst University in Kansas City, Missouri, United States.

In science

Between the sixteenth and eighteenth centuries, the teaching of science in Jesuit schools, as laid down in the Ratio atque Institutio Studiorum Societatis Iesu ("The Official Plan of studies for the Society of Jesus") of 1599, was almost entirely based on the works of Aristotle.

The Jesuits, nevertheless, have made numerous significant contributions to the development of science. For example, the Jesuits have dedicated significant study to fields from cosmology to seismology, the latter of which has been described as "the Jesuit science". The Jesuits have been described as "the single most important contributor to experimental physics in the seventeenth century". According to Jonathan Wright in his book God's Soldiers, by the eighteenth century the Jesuits had "contributed to the development of pendulum clocks, pantographs, barometers, reflecting telescopes and microscopes – to scientific fields as various as magnetism, optics, and electricity. They observed, in some cases before anyone else, the colored bands on Jupiter's surface, the Andromeda nebula, and Saturn's rings. They theorized about the circulation of the blood (independently of Harvey), the theoretical possibility of flight, the way the moon affected the tides, and the wave-like nature of light."

The Jesuit China missions of the 16th and 17th centuries introduced Western science and astronomy. One modern historian writes that in late Ming courts, the Jesuits were "regarded as impressive especially for their knowledge of astronomy, calendar-making, mathematics, hydraulics, and geography". The Society of Jesus introduced, according to Thomas Woods, "a substantial body of scientific knowledge and a vast array of mental tools for understanding the physical universe, including the Euclidean geometry that made planetary motion comprehensible".

Notable members

Notable Jesuits include missionaries, educators, scientists, artists, philosophers, and a pope. Among many distinguished early Jesuits was Francis Xavier, a missionary to Asia who converted more people to Catholicism than anyone before, and Robert Bellarmine, a Doctor of the Church. José de Anchieta and Manuel da Nóbrega, founders of the city of São Paulo, Brazil, were Jesuit priests. Another famous Jesuit was Jean de Brébeuf, a French missionary who was martyred during the 17th century in what was once New France (now Québec) in Canada.

In Spanish America, José de Acosta wrote a major work on early Peru and New Spain with important material on indigenous peoples. In South America, Peter Claver was notable for his mission to African slaves, building on the work of Alonso de Sandoval. Francisco Javier Clavijero was expelled from New Spain during the Suppression of the Society of Jesus in 1767 and wrote an important history of Mexico during his exile in Italy. Eusebio Kino is renowned in the southwestern United States and northern Mexico (an area then called the Pimería Alta). He founded numerous missions and served as the peace-bringer between the tribes and the government of New Spain. Antonio Ruiz de Montoya was an important missionary in the Jesuit reductions of Paraguay.

Baltasar Gracián was a 17th-century Spanish Jesuit and baroque prose writer and philosopher. He was born in Belmonte, near Calatayud (Aragon). His writings, particularly El Criticón (1651–7) and Oráculo Manual y Arte de Prudencia ("The Art of Prudence", 1647) were lauded by Schopenhauer and Nietzsche.

In Scotland, John Ogilvie, a Jesuit, is the nation's only post-Reformation saint.

Gerard Manley Hopkins was one of the first English poets to use sprung verse. Anthony de Mello was a Jesuit priest and psychotherapist who became widely known for his books which introduced Westerners to the East Indian traditions of spirituality.

Cardinal Jorge Bergoglio of Argentina was elected Pope Francis on 13 March 2013 and is the first Jesuit to be elected pope.

The Feast of All Jesuit Saints and Blesseds is celebrated on 5 November.

Gallery: Jesuit churches

Institutions

Educational institutions

Although the work of the Jesuits today embraces a wide variety of apostolates, ministries, and civil occupations, they are probably most well known for their educational work, on all continents. Since the inception of the order, Jesuits have been teachers. Besides serving on the faculty of Catholic and secular schools, the Jesuits are the Catholic religious order with the second highest number of schools which they run: 168 tertiary institutions in 40 countries and 324 secondary schools in 55 countries. (The Brothers of the Christian Schools have over 560 Lasallian educational institutions.) They also run elementary schools at which they are less likely to teach. Many of the schools are named after Francis Xavier and other prominent Jesuits.

After the Second Vatican Council, Jesuit schools had become a very controversial place of instruction as they abandoned teaching traditional Catholic education with things such as the mastery of Latin and the Baltimore Catechism. Jesuit schools replaced classic theological instruction from people like Thomas Aquinas and Bonaventure to people like Karl Rahner and Pierre Teilhard de Chardin which was a very controversial move at the time.

Jesuit educational institutions aim to promote the values of Eloquentia Perfecta. This is a Jesuit tradition that focuses on cultivating a person as a whole, as one learns to speak and write for the common good.

Social and development institutions
Jesuits have become increasingly involved in works directed primarily toward social and economic development for the poor and marginalized. Included in this would be research, training, advocacy, and action for human development, as well as direct services. Most Jesuit schools have an office that fosters social awareness and social service in the classroom and through extracurricular programs, usually detailed on their websites. The Jesuits also run over 500 notable or stand-alone social or economic development centres in 56 countries around the world.

Publications

Jesuits are also known for their involvement in publications. La Civiltà Cattolica, a periodical produced in Rome by the Jesuits, has often been used as a semi-official platform for popes and Vatican officials to float ideas for discussion or hint at future statements or positions. In the United States, The Way is an international journal of contemporary Christian spirituality published by the British Jesuits. America magazine has long had a prominent place in Catholic intellectual circles Most Jesuit colleges and universities have their own presses which produce a variety of books, book series, textbooks, and academic publications. Ignatius Press, founded by a Jesuit, is an independent publisher of Catholic books, most of which are of the popular academic or lay-intellectual variety. Manresa is a review of Ignatian spirituality published in Madrid, Spain.

In Australia, the Jesuits produce a number of magazines, including Eureka Street, Madonna, Australian Catholics, and Province Express.

In Germany, the Jesuits publish Geist und Leben.

In Sweden the Catholic cultural magazine Signum, edited by the Newman Institute, covers a broad spectrum of issues concerning faith, culture, research, and society. The printed version of Signum is published eight times per year.

See also

 Ad maiorem Dei gloriam
 Apostleship of Prayer
 Blas Valera
 Bollandist
 Canadian Indian residential school system
 Jesuit conspiracy theories
 Jesuit Ivy
 Jesuit missions among the Guaraní
 Jesuit Missions of Chiquitos
 Jesuit Refugee Service
 List of Jesuit sites
 List of saints of the Society of Jesus
 Misiones Province
Missionaries 
 Monumenta Historica Societatis Iesu
 Igreja de São Roque
 Sexual abuse scandal in the Society of Jesus
 Thomas Weld (of Lulworth)

Notes

References

Citations

Sources

Further reading

Surveys

 Bangert, William V. A History of the Society of Jesus (2nd ed. 1958) 552 pp.
 Barthel, Manfred. Jesuits: History & Legend of the Society of Jesus (1984) 347 pp. online free
 Chapple, Christopher. Jesuit Tradition in Education & Missions: A 450-Year Perspective (1993), 290 pp. 
 Mitchell, David. Jesuits: A History (1981) 320 pp.
 Molina, J. Michelle. To Overcome Oneself: The Jesuit Ethic and Spirit of Global Expansion, 1520–1767 (2013) online
 O'Malley, John W. The Jesuits: A History from Ignatius to the Present (2014), 138 pp
 Worcester, Thomas. ed. The Cambridge Companion to the Jesuits (2008), to 1773
 Wright, Jonathan. God's Soldiers: Adventure, Politics, Intrigue & Power: A History of the Jesuits (2004) 368 pp online free

Specialized studies
 Alden, Dauril. Making of an Enterprise: The Society of Jesus in Portugal, Its Empire & Beyond, 1540–1750 (1996).
 Brockey, Liam Matthew. Journey to the East: The Jesuit Mission to China, 1579–1724 (2007).
 , Special Edition Published 1997 by Loyola University Press, US. .
 Brodrick, James. Saint Francis Xavier (1506–1552) (1952). 
 Brodrick, James. Saint Ignatius Loyola: The Pilgrim Years 1491–1538 (1998).
 Burson, Jeffrey D. and Jonathan Wright, eds. The Jesuit Suppression in Global Context: Causes, Events, and Consequences (Cambridge UP, 2015).
 Bygott, Ursula M. L. With Pen & Tongue: The Jesuits in Australia, 1865–1939 (1980).
 Comerford, Kathleen M. Jesuit Libraries. BRILL 2023.
 Dalmases, Cándido de. Ignatius of Loyola, Founder of the Jesuits: His Life & Work (1985).
 Caraman, Philip. Ignatius Loyola: A Biography of the Founder of the Jesuits (1990).
 Edwards, Francis. Jesuits in England from 1580 to the Present Day (1985).
 Grendler, Paul F. "Jesuit Schools and Universities in Europe 1548–1773." Brill Research Perspectives in Jesuit Studies 1.1 (2019): 1–118. online
 Healy, Róisin. Jesuit Specter in Imperial Germany (2003).
 Höpfl, Harro. Jesuit Political Thought: The Society of Jesus & the State, c. 1540–1640 (2004).
 Hsia, Ronnie Po-chia. "Jesuit Foreign Missions. A Historiographical Essay." Journal of Jesuit Studies (2014) 1#1, pp. 47–65.
 Kaiser, Robert Blair. Inside the Jesuits: How Pope Francis is Changing the Church and the World (Rowman & Littlefield, 2014)
 Klaiber, Jeffrey. The Jesuits in Latin America: 1549–2000:: 450 Years of Inculturation, Defense of Human Rights, and Prophetic Witness. St Louis, MO: Institute of Jesuit Sources 2009.
 Lapomarda, Vincent A., The Catholic Bishops of Europe and the Nazi Persecutions of Catholics and Jews, Lewiston, New York: Edwin Mellen Press (2012) 
 McCoog, Thomas M., ed. Mercurian Project: Forming Jesuit Culture: 1573–1580 (2004) (30 advanced essays by scholars).
 Martin, A. Lynn. Jesuit Mind. The Mentality of an Elite in Early Modern France (1988).
 O'Malley, John. "The Society of Jesus." in R. Po-chia Hsia, ed., A Companion to the Reformation World (2004), pp. 223–236.
 O'Malley, John W. ed. Saints or Devils Incarnate? Studies in Jesuit History (2013).
 
 Pomplun, Trent. Jesuit on the Roof of the World: Ippolito Desideri's Mission to Tibet. Oxford University Press (2010). 
 Roberts, Ian D. Harvest of Hope: Jesuit Collegiate Education in England, 1794–1914 (1996).
 Ronan, Charles E. and Bonnie B. C. Oh, eds. East Meets West: The Jesuits in China, 1582–1773 (1988).
 Ross, Andrew C. Vision Betrayed: The Jesuits in Japan & China, 1542–1742 (1994).
 Santich, Jan Joseph. Missio Moscovitica: The Role of the Jesuits in the Westernization of Russia, 1582–1689 (1995).
 Schmiedl, Joachim (2011). Religious Orders as Transnational Networks of the Catholic Church, EGO – European History Online, Mainz: Institute of European History, retrieved: 25 March 2021 (pdf).
 Wright, Jonathan. "From Immolation to Restoration: The Jesuits, 1773–1814." Theological Studies (2014) 75#4 pp. 729–745.
 Zhang, Qiong. Making the New World their own: Chinese encounters with Jesuit science in the age of discovery (Brill, 2015).

United States
 Cushner, Nicholas P. Soldiers of God: The Jesuits in Colonial America, 1565–1767 (2002) 402 pp.
 Garraghan, Gilbert J. The Jesuits Of The Middle United States (3 vol 1938) covers Midwest from 1800 to 1919 vol 1 online; vol 2; vol 3
 McDonough, Peter. Men astutely trained : a history of the Jesuits in the American century (1994), covers 1900 to 1960s; online free
 Schroth, Raymond A. The American Jesuits: A History (2009)

Primary sources
 Desideri, Ippolito. "Mission to Tibet: The Extraordinary Eighteenth-Century Account of Father Ippolito Desideri." Translated by Michael J. Sweet. Edited by Leonard Zwilling. Boston: Wisdom Publications, 2010.
 Donnelly, John Patrick, ed. Jesuit Writings of the Early Modern Period: 1540–1640 (2006)

In German
 Klaus Schatz. Geschichte der deutschen Jesuiten: Bd. 1: 1814–1872 Münster: Aschendorff Verlag, 2013. XXX, 274 S. . online review
 Schatz. Geschichte der deutschen Jesuiten: Bd. 2: 1872–1917
 Schatz. Geschichte der deutschen Jesuiten: Bd. 3: 1917–1945
 Schatz. Geschichte der deutschen Jesuiten: Bd. 4: 1945–1983
 Schatz. Geschichte der deutschen Jesuiten: Bd. 5: Quellen, Glossar, Biogramme, Gesamtregister

External links

Catholic Church documents
 Benedict XVI's Address to the Members of the Society of Jesus, 22 April 2006
 Benedict XVI's Visit to the Pontifical Gregorian University, 3 November 2006

Jesuit documents
 The Jesuit Ratio Studiorum of 1599
 The Jesuit Mission Press in Japan, 1591–1610 
 Letter of the Jesuit Social Justice Secretariat to the leaders of the G8, July 2005 
 The Spiritual Exercises of St. Ignatius of Loyola

Other links
 The Jesuits, BBC Radio 4 discussion with Nigel Aston, Simon Ditchfield & Olwen Hutton (In Our Time, 18 January 2007)
 
 
 Archives of Jezuïeten – Belgische (1832–1935) En Vlaamse (1935–) Provincie. 16de Eeuw–2012 in ODIS – Online Database for Intermediary Structures 
Journal of Jesuit Studies. Institute for Advanced Jesuit Studies. Boston College.

 
Ignatius of Loyola
1540 establishments in Europe
Counter-Reformation
Religious organizations established in the 1540s
Catholic religious orders established in the 16th century